Quinn Insurance Ltd v. Price Waterhouse Cooper [2017] IESC 73; [2017] 3 I.R. 812, is a reported Irish Supreme Court case decision where an application for leave to appeal was granted. The Court had granted leave for appeal from the Court of Appeal to the Supreme Court being satisfied that the issue was a matter of public importance and in the greater interest of justice.

Background 

Quinn Insurance (under administration) was an insurance company that wanted to recover damages from Price Waterhouse Cooper (an audit firm) for losses that were allegedly caused by Price Waterhouse's failure to acknowledge that the financial statements and returns they had prepared did not accurately reflect the state of their affairs. Quinn Insurance asserted that both the contract and Price Waterhouse's obligation as an auditor were violated, constituting a breach of both the contract and the duty of care.

An order was  sought by PWC directing Quinn Insurance to provide further information in respect to certain parts of their claim.

Quinn Insurance was ordered by the High Court (Ms. Justice Costello), which ruled in favour of Price Waterhouse, to produce more information and further details regarding certain of their claim-related issues.

Price Waterhouse Cooper cross-appealed against Quinn Insurance's failure to provide specific information while Quinn Insurance appealed the High Court's ruling to the Court of Appeal. "Viewing the matter both from the standpoint both of both of practice and existing authority it would be hard to see how requests of this kind could be accommodated within the ordinary parameters of a notice for particulars." The Court of Appeal's Hogan J. stated in overturning the High Court's decision.

Holding of the Supreme Court 
Price Waterhouse Cooper appealed to the Supreme Court by way of an application for leave to appeal. The Court (O' Donnell J) granted the application. The court considered submissions by both parties and the Constitutional provisions applicable and was satisfied that the issue was a matter of sufficient public importance and interest of justice as to warrant full hearing to clarify the point.

By filing an application for leave to appeal, Price Waterhouse Cooper appealed to the Supreme Court. The Court (O'Donnell J) granted the application after considering the arguments made by both parties and the relevant constitutional provisions. The court was satisfied that the issue was important enough to the public and important enough to the administration of justice to warrant a full hearing to address it.  

All the Justices agreed with O' Donnell J.  

The Supreme Court (O'Donnell J.) ruled that Quinn Insurance should be required to directly or indirectly provide Price Waterhouse Cooper with the information it requested. According to O'Donnell J, the core of the conflict between the parties was that it was difficult for this matter to be heard and decided without those fundamental concerns being addressed. The court decided to reverse the Court of Appeal's order and reinstated the High Court's decision.

The Supreme Court (O'Donnell J.) ruled that Quinn Insurance should be required to directly or indirectly provide Price Waterhouse Cooper with the information it requested. According to O'Donnell J., it was improbable that this matter could be considered and decided without those fundamental concerns being addressed and, it was at the heart of the parties' disagreement. The court decided to overturn the Court of Appeal's ruling in that case and restore the High Court's decision.

External links 
Quinn Insurance Ltd v. Price Waterhouse Cooper

References 

2017 in case law
Supreme Court of Ireland cases
Practice of law
2017 in Irish law